A hardcourt (or hard court) is a surface or floor on which a sport is played, most usually in reference to tennis courts. It is typically made of rigid materials such as asphalt or concrete, and covered with acrylic resins to seal the surface and mark the playing lines, while providing some cushioning. Historically, hardwood surfaces were also in use in indoor settings, similar to an indoor basketball court, but these surfaces are rare now.

Tennis
Tennis hard courts are made of synthetic/acrylic layers on top of a concrete or asphalt foundation and can vary in color. These courts tend to play medium-fast to fast because there is little energy absorption by the court, as with grass courts but unlike clay courts. The ball tends to bounce high and players are able to apply many types of spin during play. Flat balls are favored on hard courts because of the extremely quick play style. Speed of rebound after tennis balls bounce on hard courts is determined by how much sand is in the synthetic/acrylic layer placed on top of the asphalt foundation. More sand will result in a slower bounce due to more friction.

Of the Grand Slam tournaments, the US Open and Australian Open currently use hard courts, and it is the predominant surface type used on the professional tour.

Maintenance
There are numerous hardcourt maintenance methods which are commonly used to keep these facilities in top condition. Some of these include brushing, pressure washing with a cleaning solution and applying chemical treatments to prevent the growth of moss and algae. Anti-slip paint is also applied to hardcourts to give better playing qualities which enhance player safety and performance.

Prominent brands 
Some prominent brands of hardcourt surfaces used at professional tournaments include:
DecoTurf
GreenSet
Laykold
Plexicushion
Rebound Ace
SportMaster Sport Surfaces

See also

Clay court
Carpet court
Grass court

References

External links
 DECONSTRUCTING THE HARD COURT ; Head.com, Simon Cambers, August 29, 2017.
 Greatest Hard Court Players in the History of Tennis, JA Allen, August 10, 2012.
 Tennis: Hard courts are hardest on the body – Nadal; Reuters, Rory Carroll, September 4, 2017.
 Sliding On Tennis' Hard Courts Inspires Awe, Poses Risks; Inside Science, Chris Gorski, August 27, 2013.
 FedEx Performance Zone: 2017 Hard-Court Records; ATP World Tour, ATP Staff, August 23, 2017.
 Concrete Jungle: WTA Insider Hard Court Power Rankings; WTA Tennis, Courtney Nguyen, July 27, 2017.

Tennis court surfaces

fr:Surfaces de jeu au tennis#Dur